Hayden Tinto (born 31 August 1985) is a Trinidad and Tobago footballer.

Career
Tinto began his career with Caledonia AIA and joined in 2009 to league rival Joe Public.

Attributes
He has achieved wide acclaim for his skill and is sometimes called from Fans the "Caribbean Maradona."

International career
Tinto scored the first international goal for the Trinidad and Tobago national team in Azteca Stadium.

Music career
He is also a trained classical violinist and has poured thousands of his own dollars into the "Hayden Tinto Academy of Fiddling" in downtown Port of Spain to provide poor young Trinidadians opportunities to learn to play stringed instruments.

References

External links

1985 births
Living people
Trinidad and Tobago international footballers
Trinidad and Tobago footballers
Association football midfielders
TT Pro League players
Morvant Caledonia United players
Joe Public F.C. players
Central F.C. players